Attitudes is Lorie's third studio album, and her fourth album overall. It has a self-admitted rockier sound than the singer's first two records and was released on 19 January 2004 in two versions: a regular, jewel case release and a limited edition digipak also containing a DVD and six stickers featuring the best-selling singing star. The album sold more than 350, 000 in Europe alone.

Track listing

CD

 "Intro" – 0:55
 "Week End" – 4:02
 "Ensorcelée" – 3:57
 "Sur la scène" – 4:17
 "En regardant la mer" – 3:51
 "Baggy, bandana et poésie" – 4:10
 "La positive attitude" – 4:31
 "C'est plus fort que moi" – 3:49
 "Si tu revenais" – 4:21
 "Ma bonne étoile" – 4:33
 "Le temps de partir" – 3:25
 "C'est fini" – 4:07
 "Au delà des frontières" – 5:11

DVD (limited edition release only)

 "Week End" (music video) – 4:02
 "Week End" (karaoke) – 4:02
 "Week End" (making of) – 26:00

Charts

Certifications

References

Lorie (singer) albums
2004 albums
Sony Music France albums